The 499th Bombardment Squadron is an inactive United States Air Force unit.  It was last assigned to the 345th Bombardment Wing at Langley Air Force Base, Virginia, where it was inactivated on 25 June 1959.

The squadron was first activated in 1942.  After training in the United States as a medium bomber unit, it deployed to the Southwest Pacific Theater, where it engaged in combat, advancing from Australia, through New Guinea and the Philippines, earning three Distinguished Unit Citations and a Philippine Presidential Unit Citation for its combat actions.  Following V-J Day, the squadron remained on Okinawa until December 1945, when it returned to the United States for inactivation.  The squadron was activated again in 1954 as a tactical bomber unit.

History

World War II
The squadron was first organized at Columbia Army Air Base, South Carolina in September 1942 as one of the four original squadrons of the 345th Bombardment Group.  However, it was not sufficiently manned to begin flight training until December.  The squadron trained with North American B-25 Mitchell medium bombers until April 1943, when it departed for the Southwest Pacific Theater.  The squadron had originally been slated for deployment to the European Theater of Operations, but was diverted to the Pacific at the request of General George C. Kenney following the successful use of medium bombers in the Battle of the Bismarck Sea.

Staging through Australia, the unit reached its combat station near Port Moresby, New Guinea in early June 1943.  In theater, its B-25s were modified, including the installation of additional fixed machine guns to equip it for strafing missions.  It flew its first combat mission on 30 June.  The squadron operated from New Guinea until July 1944, with missions that included bombing and strafing Japanese installations in New Guinea and the Bismarck Archipelago.  The squadron attacked enemy shipping in sealanes within range of its Mitchells.  It flew air support missions for ground units in the Admiralty Islands, including airdropping supplies to units.  It also flew courier and aerial reconnaissance missions.

On 2 November 1943, the squadron flew a series of attacks on flak positions, coastal defenses and barracks at Rabaul, a major Japanese naval base in New Britain.  These attacks earned the squadron a Distinguished Unit Citation (DUC).  It earned a second DUC in February 1944 for attacks in the Admiralities.  In July 1944, the 499th moved to Biak Island in the Netherlands East Indies.  From its new base, it attacked airfields and shipping in the Philippines and Celebes.  It continued moving forward with Douglas MacArthur's forces, occupying a base in the Philippines in November 1944, which enabled it to strike military targets throughout the island nation and strike industrial targets as far north as Formosa.  It was awarded a third DUC for an attack on Saigon, French Indochina in April 1945.

In July 1945, the squadron moved to Ie Shima Airfield in the Ryuku Islands, from which it was able to attack shipping in the Sea of Japan and carry out a few raids on Kyushu.  Following V-J Day, the squadron remained at Ie Shima until December, when it returned to the United States and was inactivated at the port of embarkation on 19 December 1945.

Tactical Air Command
The squadron was reactivated at Langley Air Force Base, Virginia in July 1954 when its parent 345th Bombardment Group replaced the 4400th Bombardment Group there.  The squadron was initially equipped with some of the 4400th's Douglas B-26 Invaders, pending the delivery of its Martin B-57B Canberra jet bombers.  The squadron trained to maintain combat proficiency in locating, attacking, and destroying targets from all altitudes and under all conditions of weather and light.   It was inactivated at Langley on 25 June 1959 in connection with the phaseout of the Canberra from Tactical Air Command.

Lineage
 Constituted as the 499th Bombardment Squadron (Medium) on 3 September 1942
 Activated on 8 September 1942
 Redesignated 499th Bombardment Squadron, Medium in 1944
 Inactivated on 19 December 1945
 Redesignated 499th Bombardment Squadron, Tactical on 22 March 1954
 Activated on 19 July 1954
 Inactivated on 25 June 1959

Assignments
 345th Bombardment Group, 8 September 1942 – 19 December 1945
 345th Bombardment Group, 19 July 1954
 345th Bombardment Wing, 8 October 1957 – 25 June 1959

Stations

 Columbia Army Air Base, South Carolina, 8 September 1942
 Walterboro Army Air Field, South Carolina, 6 March-16 April 1943
 Jackson Airfield (7 Mile Drome), New Guinea, 5 June 1943
 Dobodura Airfield Complex, New Guinea, 15 January 1944
 Nadzab Airfield Complex, New Guinea, 18 February 1944
 Mokmer Airfield, Biak, Netherlands East Indies, 24 July 1944
 Dulag Airfield, Leyte, Philippines (operated from Mokmer Airfield), 12 November 1944

 Tacloban Airfield, Leyte, Philippines, 27 December 1944
 San Marcelino Airfield, Luzon, Philippines, 12 February 1945
 Clark Field, Luzon, Philippines, 12 May 1945
 Ie Shima Airfield, Ryuku Islands, 28 July-1 December 1945
 Fort Lewis, Washington, 17–19 December 1945
 Langley Air Force Base, Virginia, 19 July 1954 – 25 June 1959

Aircraft
 North American B-25 Mitchell, 1942–1945
 Douglas B-26 Invader, 1954–1955
 Martin B-57B Canberra, 1955–1959

Awards and campaigns

References

Notes
 Explanatory notes

 Citations

Bibliography

 
 
 
 
 

Bombardment squadrons of the United States Air Force
Bombardment squadrons of the United States Army Air Forces
Military units and formations established in 1942